The men's 100 metres (T38) at the 2022 Commonwealth Games, as part of the athletics programme, took place in the Alexander Stadium on 3 August 2022.

Records
Prior to this competition, the existing world and Games records were as follows:

Schedule
The schedule was as follows:

All times are British Summer Time (UTC+1)

Results

Final
The medals were determined in the final.

Wind:  0.3 m/s

References

Men's 100 metres (T38)